Nair Oganesovich Tiknizyan (born 12 May 1999) is a football player who plays as a left-back for FC Lokomotiv Moscow. He also plays at left midfielder. Born in Russia, he represented the country on junior levels before switching to representing Armenia.

Official sources such as UEFA or Russian Premier League list his first name as Nayair. The clerk who issued his birth certificate made a mistake which has been perpetuated in all official documents since. Tiknizyan himself said he can not find the time to officially petition for a change of name.

Club career

CSKA Moscow 
Tiknizyan made his debut for the main squad of PFC CSKA Moscow on 20 September 2017 in a Russian Cup game against FC Avangard Kursk. He made his second appearance on 10 October 2018 in a Russian Cup game against FC Tyumen.

On 9 January 2019, CSKA Moscow announced that Tiknizyan had signed a new contract with the club until the summer of 2022.

He made his Russian Premier League debut for CSKA on 25 August 2019 in a game against FC Akhmat Grozny, as a 89th-minute substitute for Ivan Oblyakov.

On 20 January 2020, Tiknizyan moved on loan to Avangard Kursk until the end of the 2019–20 season.

On 11 September 2020, Tiknizyan extended his contract with CSKA until the end of the 2024–25 season.

FC Lokomotiv Moscow 
On 4 August 2021, Lokomotiv Moscow announced the signing of Tiknizyan on a five-year deal.

International career
Tiknizyan represented Russia at the 2021 UEFA European Under-21 Championship and scored a goal in their opening group stage 4–1 victory against Iceland. Russia lost two remaining games and was eliminated at group stage.

In March 2023, Tiknizyan accepted a call-up to Armenia national football team.

Career statistics

Club

References

1999 births
Footballers from Saint Petersburg
Russian people of Armenian descent
Living people
Russian footballers
Russia youth international footballers
Russia under-21 international footballers
Armenian footballers
Association football midfielders
PFC CSKA Moscow players
FC Avangard Kursk players
FC Lokomotiv Moscow players
Russian Premier League players
Russian First League players